La Figuera is a town in Priorat, Catalonia, Spain. It has an altitude of 575 meters. From the hermitage of Sant Pau it is said that lands of seven provinces can  be seen.
The extension of the term is 18.75 km² and vineyard and olive tree predominates.

References

External links
Town council website 
 Government data pages 

Municipalities in Priorat
Populated places in Priorat